SCP – Containment Breach is an indie horror video game developed by Joonas "Regalis" Rikkonen based on fictional stories from the SCP Foundation collaborative writing wiki. The player takes the role of a human test subject, imprisoned in an underground testing facility devoted to containing and studying anomalous entities known as SCPs. The goal of the game is to escape from the facility as the role of a class-d personnel during a breach of these anomalies while also avoiding security teams that are sent in to contain them. The game has a procedurally generated play area featuring multiple anomalies from the SCP wiki.

The game was released digitally on April 15, 2012, for download and was supported with digital content updates until its most recent update 1.3.11 on July 29, 2018.

Gameplay 
The player controls a prisoner named D-9341 as they attempt to escape an underground research and containment facility amidst a breach of its numerous anomalies, known as SCPs. During gameplay, the player roams the facility collecting items necessary to progress while being pursued by multiple SCP and armed enemies, which must be avoided in order to continue playing.

The game plays from a first-person perspective with the player directly in control of D-9341, able to walk and sprint in any direction. One of the characteristics of gameplay is the blink meter. Throughout the entirety of the playthrough, the blink meter will gradually decrease and eventually force the player to blink, though the player can also blink on command. This mechanic is directly tied to SCP-173, who operates based on whether or not the player can see them. The player can save and load games depending on difficulty, with the game's medium difficulty only allowing saving at predetermined points and the game's hardest difficulty not allowing saving at all.

One of the game's primary features is procedural generation of the facility. By design, the layout of the facility in every playthrough will be different, though every playthrough will contain the same key areas and rooms no matter the layout. As the player progresses through the facility, the number of threats present to them increases, including new SCPs which begin to hunt the player. The "Entrance Zone" area also marks the appearance of a Foundation task force, a squad of three soldiers which attempt to recapture SCPs and will shoot the player on sight. The player must then find an exit gate in order to reach the end.

Along the way, the player can find a wide variety of items to assist them in survival. These include tools such as gas masks, various electronic devices, and keycards allowing progression, but there are also items which hinder the player. The player may also find benign SCPs which can benefit them, in ways such as giving the player items or accelerating progression throughout the game.

Plot 

The game takes place in a containment facility run by the SCP Foundation, which possesses and researches multiple anomalous artifacts and entities. During gameplay, a breach occurs, allowing numerous entities to exit containment. Throughout the facility, clues in the form of documents and computer terminals are scattered hinting towards how the breach may have occurred.

The player takes the role of D-9341, a disposable test subject (known as Class-D personnel) who is forced along with two other test subjects to perform tests on an SCP known as SCP-173, a concrete statue that can move at high speeds and attack by causing cervical fractures at the base of the skull or strangulation when not in the direct line of sight of a person.

During this testing routine, the system malfunctions, allowing SCP-173 to kill the other two test subjects and escape while D-9341 escapes the containment chamber. The site is then put under lockdown. D-9341 must then attempt to escape the facility while trying to survive many of the escaped SCPs which roam the facility, including SCP-106, an entity resembling a decaying old man that attempts to drag the player into a pocket dimension to kill them, and SCP-096, a humanoid creature that will chase and kill the player if they view its face. The player must additionally evade the Nine-Tailed Fox task force, which are Foundation soldiers deployed to recapture the SCPs, as they have been ordered to target and kill any stray Class-D personnel. Later in the game, the player encounters SCP-079, a sentient A.I., and learns that it caused a power outage resulting in the containment breach. From here SCP-079 will propose that the player reactivates the door control system, allowing SCP-079 to regain control over the doors, in exchange for helping the player escape the facility. After re-activating the door control system, four different endings can be reached, depending on choices the player made while playing the game & how the player leaves the facility.

After the player reaches an ending and returns to the menu, a radio transmission presumably from the Foundation will play detailing events after gameplay. These messages vary from ending to ending, and change in tone depending on whether the player was captured or not.

Development

The game was created by Finnish developer Joonas "Regalis" Rikkonen. Before creating SCP  Containment Breach, Rikkonen had played the game SCP-087 (about a seemingly endless stairwell and a mysterious entity that lurks within) and was impressed at how terrifying the game was given its relatively simple premise. Rikkonen decided to work on his version, which he released as SCP-087-B; this minigame eventually became so popular that he decided to work on a larger game that included more SCPs. Rikkonen started to design his game in Blitz3D because, in his own words, "I was too lazy to start learning some other language or engine." As the game was being designed, Rikkonen decided that the main enemy would be SCP-173 because it was a personal favorite and he also felt that implementing a blink function into the program would make gameplay more interesting.

The game is highly atmospheric, as Rikkonen felt that the best way to create a truly scary game would be to focus on the environment and soundscape, rather than exclusively the monsters. In an interview with Edge magazine, he said:

I think one of the things that makes Containment Breach so scary is that the player is almost never safe, and even the slightest slip can end the game. You have to constantly stay alert for SCP-173, listening for any scraping sounds and carefully looking around when entering a new room. The randomly generated map and randomly placed events are an important part of making CB scary too. No matter how many times you play it, you can never be 100 percent sure what happens next. I’ve also spent a lot of time looking for and making the sounds and music clips for the game. [The] atmosphere is one of the key elements of a good horror game, and a well-made soundscape adds a lot to the atmosphere.

And while Rikkonen found them to be "a somewhat cheap way of scaring people", he implemented several jump scares to "keep the players on their toes." He explained, "When you’re making a game about a creature that charges at you with supernatural speed when you’re not looking at it, you pretty much have to have some jump scares."

When Rikkonen first started working on the game, he was graduating from upper secondary school. While he enjoyed making games, he had always considered it a mere hobby and a "pipe dream". However, after the success of the game, Rikkonen decided to pursue game programming at the University of Turku.

Over the course of its development, SCP  Containment Breach has become the combined effort of its community, relying largely on community-created content for its updates.

Between v1.3 and v1.3.11, a group of independent game developers called Third Subdivision Studios assisted Regalis, who was mostly focused on his other game titled Subsurface, which later became Barotrauma. Third Subdivision also created a mod of the game called SCP – Nine-Tailed Fox, which swaps the player's role for that of one of the Nine-Tailed Fox agents.

Following the release of v1.3.11, v1.4 began development, meant to be the final update. After internal conflicts within the development team, a member of Third Subvision Studios was suspended from further working on the game, leading to Third Subvision Studio's withdrawal from the project. Development continued with a vastly reduced team, the plans for 1.4 changing a multitude of times. v1.4 is being developed on a new custom game engine named PGE ("pulsegun engine").

Reception
The game has received generally positive reviews. Gaming website Rock, Paper, Shotgun said "It's Warehouse 13 without the quips and the quirks but with a lot more panic, screaming and hiding from creatures made of teeth and wire" adding that "it has a fairly weak model and texture at the moment but hopefully it’ll turn into a massive collaboration". Edge magazine gave the game a positive review, calling it an "indie title made in the low-end Blitz3D engine that casts a cheap-looking creature", but adding it "somehow manages to be scarier than most recent big-budget horror games combined." Jay Is Games wrote that while the game was "not perfect and still a little buggy", it nevertheless "has some serious moments of inarticulate, squealing terror." Nicholas Greene of GeekInsider wrote positively of the gameplay, specifically applauding the use of the blink timer. Greene also noted that its "somewhat dated appearance does absolutely nothing to make it less frightening". The game was featured at the number 22 spot on PC Gamer'''s top 50 best free PC games, saying that "Containment Breachs power is doubled by drawing on the SCP mythos: a set of invented (or are they?) internet stories about horrors and monsters locked up by a shadowy organization". With the release of version 0.8 in late 2013, Ian Birnbaum of PC Gamer once again reiterated the site's praise for the game, calling it "excellently scary".

AdaptationsSCP – Containment Breach's basic formula and assets have been adapted into multiple other games, such as the free multiplayer game SCP: Secret Laboratory and the (now discontinued) modern interpretation SCP: Unity'' on the Unity game engine.

References

External links
 
 SCP Foundation wiki

SCP Foundation
2012 video games
Creative Commons-licensed video games
Freeware games
Horror video games
Indie video games
Open-source video games
Science fantasy video games
Single-player video games
Video games about the paranormal
Video games developed in Finland
Video games using procedural generation
Windows games
Windows-only games